The East Liverpool Downtown Historic District is located in East Liverpool, Ohio.

East Liverpool, Ohio, was a thriving center of the pottery making business in the late 19th and early 20th centuries. From the 1880s until 1910 the population of the city increased from around 5,000 to over 22,000 people. The historic downtown district is notable for its Italianate and Second Empire artchitecture as well as its prominence as a commercial center in East Liverpool's history.

References

Italianate architecture in Ohio
Second Empire architecture in Ohio
East Liverpool, Ohio
Historic districts in Columbiana County, Ohio
National Register of Historic Places in Columbiana County, Ohio
Historic districts on the National Register of Historic Places in Ohio